Hungary competed at the 2004 Summer Paralympics in Athens, Greece. The team included 37 athletes—25 men and 12 women. Hungarian competitors won nineteen medals, one gold, eight silver and ten bronze, to finish 46th in the medal table.

Medallists

Sports

Athletics

Men's field

Women's track

Boccia

Equestrian

Goalball
The men's goalball team didn't win any medals; they were 7th out of 12 teams.

Players
Szillard Belafi
Szabolcs Hajba
Sandor Orsos
Zsolt Orsos
Andras Szabo
Sandor Szell

Tournament

Judo

Men

Women

Powerlifting

Men

Swimming

Men

Women

Table tennis

Men

Wheelchair fencing

Men

Women

Teams

See also
Hungary at the Paralympics
Hungary at the 2004 Summer Olympics

References 

Nations at the 2004 Summer Paralympics
2004
Summer Paralympics